Gymnobathra primaria is a moth in the family Oecophoridae first described by Alfred Philpott in 1928. It is endemic to New Zealand. It has been hypothesised that this species likely belongs to another genus.

References

Moths described in 1928
Oecophoridae
Taxa named by Alfred Philpott
Moths of New Zealand
Endemic fauna of New Zealand
Endemic moths of New Zealand